Mike Gillespie (born April 2, 1951) is the former head men's basketball coach at Florida A&M University.

High school coaching
Gillespie began coaching career on the high school level in his home state, winning 223 games from 1974 through 1987.

College coaching
Starting in 1988, Gillespie coached at St. Leo College (now St. Leo University) in St. Leo, Florida, just north of Tampa. There, he won 26 games in two seasons (1988–89 to 1989–90), including a 15–12 mark his first year.

Gillespie then moved to Tallahassee, where he built the now nationally renowned Tallahassee Community College program from scratch. From 1991–92 to 2000–01, Gillespie guided the Eagles to 258 wins in 10 seasons.  Compiling back-to-back 30-plus win seasons in 1995–96 (30–2) and 1996–97 (35–2), his teams were annually ranked among the nation's best junior college programs.

He then moved to Division I Florida A&M, where he compiled a record of 60–64, won two MEAC men's basketball tournament championships, and made two NCAA Division I men's basketball tournament appearances, in 2004 and 2007. In his last season, he led the Rattlers to their first 20-win season since 1989–90.

Stalking charges
Beginning in March 2005, police investigated Gillespie several times on stalking complaints, and warned Gillespie to stop his behavior.

On May 25, 2007, Gillespie was arrested on a misdemeanor stalking charge.  His accuser had previously reported Gillespie to police on May 15, 2007, but declined to file charges.  However, she filed charges after he stalked her at work again on May 24 and 25.  Gillespie was released from jail on a $1,000 bond.

Florida A&M put Gillespie on paid administrative leave on May 30, and fired him on August 14, 2007, citing the stalking charges.

Professional coaching career
The Jacksonville JAM, Jacksonville's professional basketball team, hired Mike Gillespie as head coach for the 2007–08 Premier Basketball League season.

Head coaching record

College

References

1951 births
Living people
American men's basketball coaches
American men's basketball players
Basketball coaches from Illinois
Basketball players from Illinois
DePaul Blue Demons men's basketball players
Florida A&M Rattlers basketball coaches
High school basketball coaches in the United States
Junior college men's basketball coaches in the United States
Saint Leo Lions men's basketball coaches
Sportspeople from Joliet, Illinois